Rosslyn is an unincorporated community in Powell County, Kentucky, United States.

A post office was established at Rosslyn in 1898, and remained in operation until 1917.  The community most likely was named for the roses near the original town site.

References

Unincorporated communities in Powell County, Kentucky
Unincorporated communities in Kentucky
1898 establishments in Kentucky